Baisserferidae is an extinct family in the order Trichoptera (caddis flies). Its fossil dates range from 161 to 112 million years old. It was lacustrine and terrestrial and was found in the Jurassic range of Russia and the Cretaceous range of Mongolia and Russia. It is recognized from other caddis flies with its fore wings in a distinct "M" pattern.

References

Citations

Bibliography
 
 

Trichoptera families